Cymindis chodjaii is a species of ground beetle in the subfamily Harpalinae. It was described by Morvan in 1975.

References

chodjaii
Beetles described in 1975